was a village located in Agatsuma District, Gunma Prefecture, Japan. The village was established in 1889.

As of 2003, the village had an estimated population of 2,373 and a density of 70.94 persons per km². The total area was 33.45 km².

On March 27, 2006, Azuma, along with the town of Agatsuma (also from Agatsuma District), was merged to create the town of Higashiagatsuma.

External links
 Higashiagatsuma official website 

Dissolved municipalities of Gunma Prefecture
Higashiagatsuma, Gunma